is a manufacturer of high-performance automotive, motorcycle and outboard suspension systems based in Gyoda, Saitama in Japan.

The company was founded in 1938 as Showa Aircraft Precision Works. In Japan's drive to develop its military capability in preparation for World War II, Showa supplied aircraft suspension and landing systems to various aircraft manufacturers. Banned from developing or manufacturing aircraft systems after the war, Showa entered the car components industry, using its aircraft knowledge to develop specialist suspension products for motorcycles made by the new company Honda. The relationship between Showa and Honda developed over the years, with Honda Racing Corporation accounting for more than 50% of Showa's business.

In 1950 Showa acquired Rikuo Motorcycle, which made licensed versions of Harley Davidson motorcycles in the 1930s and 1940s. Rikuo brand lasted until 1962. Showa has since become OEM supplier to Harley Davidson.

Showa has overseas facilities in Brazil, Canada, China, India, Indonesia, Mexico, Spain, Taiwan, Thailand, United Kingdom, United States and Vietnam.

Showa was an official IndyCar Series dampers, springs and shock absorber supplier from 2007 to 2011 alongside Penske Racing Shocks which only supplying shocks for Team Penske. Showa remained IndyCar Series shock absorber supplier since 2012 but only for Honda-powered teams.

In October 2019, Showa began to be merged into Hitachi Automotive Systems as their supplier of steering and suspension components, along with Keihin and Nissin Kogyo, also partners of both Honda and Hitachi. The merger was completed in January 2021, with the resulting parts supplier known as Hitachi Astemo (Japanese). The Showa brand continues to be used within this structure.

See also

Shock absorber
Motorcycle suspension
Motorcycle fork
List of motorcycle suspension manufacturers
Showa Aircraft Industry

References

External links
Official site

Auto parts suppliers of Japan
Companies listed on the Tokyo Stock Exchange
Companies based in Saitama Prefecture
Manufacturing companies established in 1938
Japanese brands

Motorcycle parts manufacturers
Japanese companies established in 1938